The 1913 Presbyterian Blue Hose football team represented Presbyterian College as an independent during the 1913 college football season. Led by Everett Booe in his first and only season as head coach, the Blue Hose compiled a record of 5–3. The team captain was D. D. "Red" Thomas.

Schedule

References

Presbyterian
Presbyterian Blue Hose football seasons
Presbyterian Blue Hose football